is the first train station on the Sagano Scenic Line, a sightseeing train that follows the picturesque Hozukyo Ravine of the old JR West Sagano Line. It is located in Kamigyo-ku, Kyoto, Japan.

Station layout 

It is wheelchair accessible.

The building includes a concourse, rest area, café, and bike rentals. The Diorama Kyoto Japan contains one of Japan's biggest HO scale model train collections, and a large diorama of Kyoto's historic sites and neighbourhoods.

Several preserved Japanese steam locomotives are also on static display in the 19th Century Hall and by the main entrance, including:

 JNR Class C58 48
 JNR Class D51 51 (demolished in 2019 due to aging)
 JNR Class C56 98

Adjacent stations 
The JR West Saga-Arashiyama Station is adjacent, for services to Kyoto, Kameoka, Sonobe, and Fukuchiyama.

References

External links 
 
 
 

Stations of Sagano Scenic Railway
Railway stations in Japan opened in 1991